Laurie Rippon (born 9 August 1950) is a former Australian rules footballer who played with Footscray in the Victorian Football League (VFL).

Notes

External links 

Laurie Rippon's playing statistics from The VFA Project

		
Living people		
1950 births		
Australian rules footballers from Victoria (Australia)		
Western Bulldogs players
Prahran Football Club players